The men's combined event was part of the alpine skiing programme at the 1936 Winter Olympics. It was the debut of alpine skiing at the Winter Olympics, and was the only men's event. The competition consisted of a downhill race on Friday, 7 February and two slalom heats on Sunday, 9 February.

Sixty-six alpine skiers from 21 nations competed. Notably absent were Austria and Switzerland.

Downhill

The race started at 12 noon. The women's downhill was run immediately prior at 11 am.

One racer was disqualified and five racers did not finish. James Riddell of Great Britain was injured after crashing into a tree.

Slalom

The slalom race was held on Sunday, 9 February 1936 on the slalom slope at Gudiberg.

Rather than disqualification, penalties were added to the finishing time when competitors missed a gate.

The race started at 11 a.m. and the competitors started in the finish order of the downhill race. Downhill winner Birger Ruud was the first racer on the slalom course, but finished sixth in the slalom portion and fourth overall.

After the first run of slalom, the jury decided which competitors were allowed to continue, so only 33 racers competed in the second run.

(1) 6 seconds penalty added

(2) 12 seconds penalty added

(3) 18 seconds penalty added

Final standings
After the downhill race and the two slalom runs, the points results were averaged to determine the winner.

References

External links
Official Olympic Report – 1936 Olympic Winter Games –   
 

Men's alpine skiing at the 1936 Winter Olympics